Kevin M. Murai (born 1963) is the president and chief executive officer of Synnex Corporation.

Career
A graduate of the University of Waterloo in Ontario, Murai has a Bachelor of Applied Science. He took employment with Ingram Micro, holding several senior management positions including those of president and chief operating officer. In March 2008, he joined Synnex, working as co-chief executive officer alongside company founder Robert T. Huang. In December 2008, Murai became the sole CEO and president.
He partially attributed a decline of revenues in early 2012 to the Synnex's focus on higher-margin instead of higher-volume products.
He joined the board of directors of the Silicon Valley Leadership Group in 2011.

Compensation
While Co-CEO of Synnex Corporation in 2008, Murai earned a total compensation of $3,328,039, which included a base salary of $261,539, a cash bonus of $900,000, stocks granted of $970,500, and options granted of $1,188,000.
Compensation in 2009 was base salary of $498,076, cash bonus of $1,100,000, plus stocks and grants totally $2,882,076.

References

External links
Synnex Internal Website

American telecommunications industry businesspeople
Living people
1963 births
American chief executives
American chief operating officers